= Di Asa =

Ghanaian reality TV show

Di Asa is a reality show that is telecast on Atinka TV. The reality show engage plus sized woman who are market women from the sixteen regions of Ghana to compete together by showing their dancing skills and the winners would be rewarded at the end of the show or program.

== Winners ==
Winners	Year
Love Newton	2022 (Di Asa Xtra)
Rachael Anny	2021 (S5)
Dee Baby	2020 (S4)
PM	2019 (S3)
Abi	2018 (S2)
Love Newton	2017 (S1)
