= PM (Di Asa winner) =

Ghanaian trader, model, dancer, influencer and actress

Precious Mensah
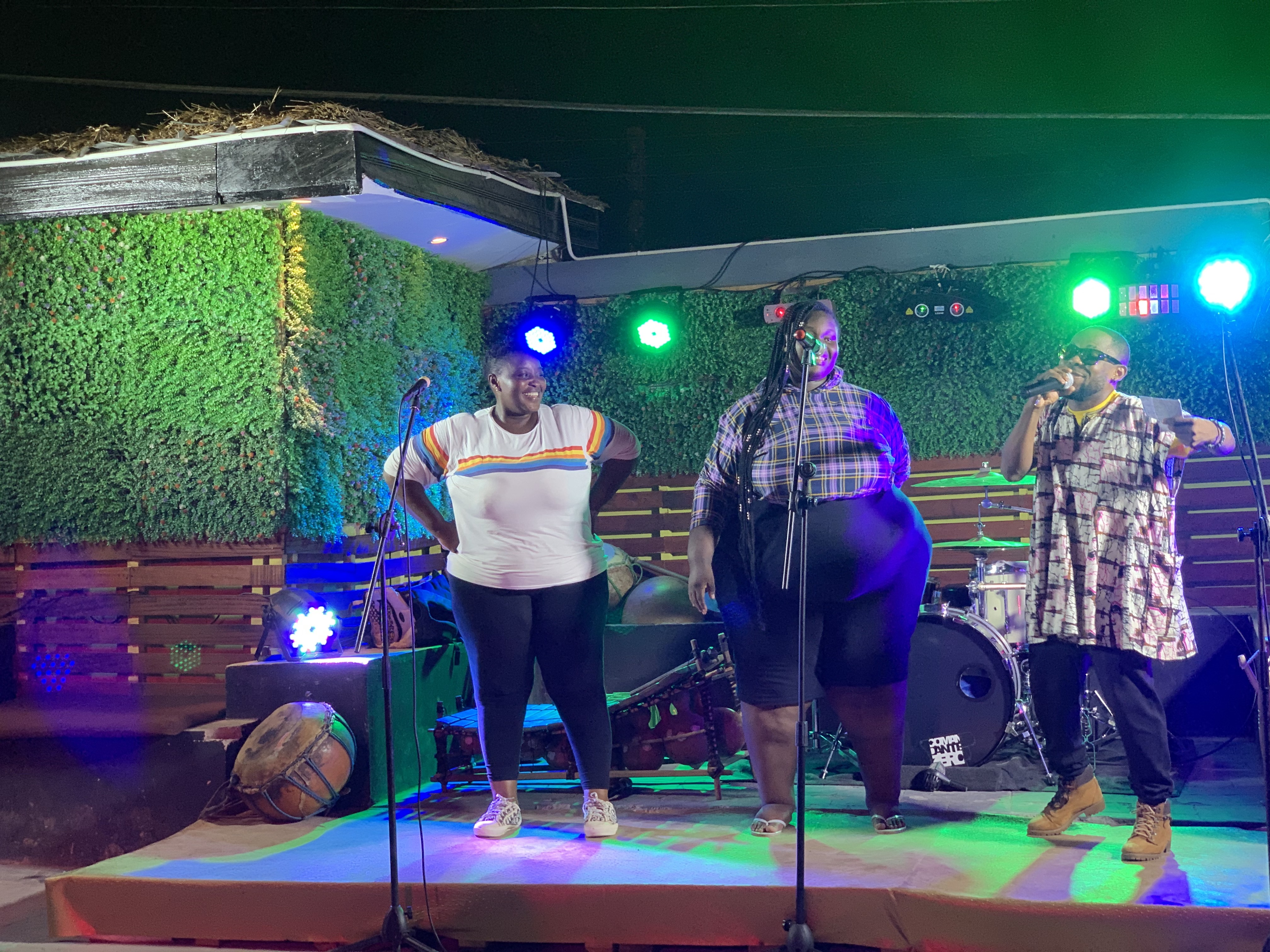
- PM on stage to perform at the Batakari Festival at Kono Bar at Osu
- Born: Accra- Ghana
- Occupations: Trader, plus model, dancer, influencer& Actress
- Known for: Di Asa Winner

Precious Mensah better known by her stage name PM, is a Ghanaian market woman who won the 2019 edition of Di Asa, a reality show that features selected plus-sized market women from the 16 regions of Ghana. These women (also called queens in the competition) compete in a dancing competition and are subsequently rewarded at the end of the competition.

== Dubai controversy ==
As part of her rewards for winning the competition, PM together with the first and second runners up were expected to go on an all expense paid trip to Dubai through the airline Emirates.

This trip was supposed to be PM's first trip in a plane and she had already made plans on things to do once she got to Dubai, which included pre-Christmas shopping and a tour of interesting places she had heard of. When asked about her expectations she said: "I've heard of the tallest building and an exceptional fountain. I want to see and learn about them. I also want to go and study the culture of Dubai and a host of others."

PM was unable to board the flight due to her size and the likely situation of her inconveniencing other passengers, which might result in a lawsuit against the airline. The two other runners up were able to make the trip.

According to Atinka media village, the main sponsors of the program, Emirates denied PM a seat due to her size. They had followed all departure formalities and also informed the ticketing agents about the need for special seats due to the size of the queens (as they are referred to in the competition). Unfortunately at 5:30pm, a few minutes to boarding time, an agent from the airline informed the media house that the airline (Emirates) was unable to complete the check-in process for PM without giving any tangible reason.

On Sunday 17 November 2019, Ama Gyenfa Ofosu Darkwa, popularly known as Embosuohemaa stated that the Atinka Media Village offered to pay for an extra seat for PM, however, the airline reported that two seats were not enough for her due to her size. The media house offered to buy a third seat but the airline company informed the media house that it was not going to be possible. The two other women proceeded with the trip while PM was left behind. She (Embosuohemaa) used the opportunity to call on travelling services to make arrangements to be able to accommodate people of all sizes. She also added that the media house had resolved to provide a Dubai-like experience for her in Ghana.

According to PM what Embosuohemaa said was not entirely accurate and not exactly what transpired. She believed she said what she said from a good heart trying to put herself in her shoes. She added that she did not want to speak about the issue and that in due time everything would be brought to light. Moreover, due to what happened, she planned on launching a campaign that will focus on the stigma on plus-sized women. She said; "I want to use my campaign to let the world know that there are different people with different body types and everyone should be given equal access to certain things. I would want to use my platform to tell women who are like me to learn to love themselves and believe in whatever they do." She also added that she had received all that she had been promised from the Atinka Media Village and that the media house owed her nothing.

In an interview, PM claimed she did not know how much she weighed but always knew her size could be a hindrance for her in situations as these.

In response to the situation, Emirates released a statement as follows; "We respect our customers' privacy and cannot discuss specific customer details or cases. Emirates places the highest standards on in-flight safety and as part of this, it is a requirement that all passengers are safely and comfortably seated with their seatbelt fastened. An industry practise for passengers who cannot be accommodated in a single seat due to their size is for them to purchase an extra seat for their own safety and comfort, should a seat be available."

== See also ==
- Di Asa
